Jeanloup Sieff (November 30, 1933 – September 20, 2000) was a French photographer. He was born in Paris to Polish parents. He was a photography student of Gertrude Fehr. He is famous for his portraits of politicians, famous artists, landscapes, as well as for his nudes and use of wide-angle lens and visible dodging marks. He worked mainly in black and white and in fashion. 

He died in Paris.

Works
 Femme assise sur une chaise, 1972, 40 x 30 cm, Musée d'art de Toulon

References

External links
Staley Wise Gallery
Jeanloup Sieff
 Jean-Loup Sieff's portfolio (146 photos)
Sonia Sieff

1933 births
2000 deaths
Magnum photographers
Photographers from Paris
French people of Polish descent